Since May–June 2022, a series of labour strikes and industrial disputes have occurred in various industries of the United Kingdom's economy as workers walked out over pay and conditions. The strikes took place with rising inflation, and demands for pay increases that would keep pace with this inflation.

The strikes began on 15 June 2022 after members of the National Union of Rail, Maritime and Transport Workers (RMT) voted to strike over planned changes to their pay and working conditions. They were soon joined by other railway unions, and a series of one-day strikes halted trains in many parts of the British mainland. Train services operated at 20% of normal capacity on strike days. Public support for the strikes was organised through the Enough is Enough! campaign.

With industrial action on the railways ongoing, trade union members working in other industries voted to take industrial action, including telecommunications, the postal service, legal profession and freight, as well as other areas of the transport sector.

Transport

Rail transport

National Union of Rail, Maritime and Transport Workers

Following a ballot of National Union of Rail, Maritime and Transport Workers members over whether to take industrial action, it was announced on 24 May 2022 that they had voted in favour of strike action, paving the way for the UK's first national rail strike for three decades. Workers at Avanti West Coast, c2c, Chiltern Railways, CrossCountry, East Midlands Railway, Greater Anglia, Great Western (GWR), London North Eastern Railway, Northern Trains, Southeastern, South Western Railway, TransPennine Express and West Midlands Trains voted to strike, with 71% of those balloted taking part in the vote; of those 89% voting in favour of strike action and 11% against. The ballot at Thameslink, Southern and Great Northern did not support strike action but supported industrial action short of a strike. Mick Lynch, General Secretary of the RMT said the decision "sends a clear message that members want a decent pay rise, job security and no compulsory redundancies". The action would see the largest outbreak of industrial action in the United Kingdom since 1989, and the first national strike involving the UK's railways since 1994, when signal workers walked out over a pay dispute with Railtrack.

On 7 June, initial strike dates were announced for 21, 23 and 25 June, with rail employees at Network Rail and 13 train operators joining the action. It was also announced that the 21 June strike would coincide with a planned 24-hour strike to be held by workers on the London Underground.  The 21 June walkout involved 40,000 rail staff, as well as 10,000 workers from London Underground. Further strikes were subsequently called for 27 July, 18 and 20 August. and 15 and 17 September. Following the death of Queen Elizabeth II on 8 September, the strikes scheduled for 15 and 17 September were suspended. On 20 September a strike was announced for 1 October. 

On 22 September, an RMT strike was announced for 8 October, which the union described as "effectively shutting down the railway network". As the 8 October strike approached, and with no further national strikes scheduled for after then, Mick Lynch announced that members would be balloted to determine if they wished to continue with the strikes. On 19 October, a further three strike days were announced for November, occurring on 3, 5, and 7 November. On 4 November the RMT announced the strikes had been suspended and that they would enter into "a period of intensive negotiations" with Network Rail and the train operators. Network Rail announced that because of the strikes had been called off at the eleventh hour there would remain "severe disruption" to services the following day, as well as on 7 November.

In Scotland, a separate strike was called for 10 October after the RMT rejected a 5% pay offer from ScotRail that was described as a "kick in the teeth". An RMT strike involving staff at Avanti West Coast was held on 22 October, forcing the cancellation of a number of services throughout the day.

On 22 November, the RMT announced four 48-hour strike in the run up to Christmas and early 2023, with strike action scheduled for 13–14 December, 16–17 December, 3–4 January and 6–7 January. On 5 December, RMT staff working for Network Rail (roughly half of those involved in the dispute) announced a strike over Christmas, beginning at 6pm on Christmas Eve and continuing until 6am on 27 December.

On 10 February 2023, the RMT's executive committee rejected a pay deal described by the Rail Delivery Group and Network Rail as their "best and final" offer, and said they would seek further negotiations. Industry and the UK government had wanted the deal to be put to the RMT's members in a ballot. On 16 February the RMT announced four new days of strikes during March and April, with the dates confirmed as 16, 18 and 30 March, and 1 April. On 7 March, RMT staff working for Network Rail called off a strike planned for 16 March after being given a fresh pay offer.

Associated Society of Locomotive Engineers and Firemen
On 9 June, members of the Associated Society of Locomotive Engineers & Firemen (ASLEF) voted to strike in a separate dispute. The union, which represents train drivers, announced plans to hold strike action on 23 and 26 June and 13 and 14 July. The train operators affected were Hull Trains, Greater Anglia and Tramlink. ASLEF members staged a strike on 2 July, affecting 90% of train services operated by Greater Anglia.

On 11 July, members of the Associated Society of Locomotive Engineers and Firemen (ASLEF) at eight train operators voted to take strike action in a dispute over pay, while members of the Transport Salaried Staffs Association (TSSA) at Southwestern also voted to take industrial action. On 14 July, ASLEF announced that train drivers at eight train companies – Arriva Rail London, Chiltern Railways, Great Western Railway, LNER, Greater Anglia, Southeastern, Hull Trains and West Midlands Trains – would strike on 30 July, involving around 5,500 union members. A second day of ASLEF strike action was subsequently staged on 13 August.

On 25 August, train drivers at Chiltern Railways, Northern Trains and Transpennine Express belonging to the ASLEF union voted to take strike action in a dispute over pay and conditions.

On 31 August ASLEF announced that train drivers from 12 train companies would strike on 15 September, but the strike was suspended following the death of Queen Elizabeth II on 8 September. On 20 September a further two strikes were announced for 1 and 5 October.

On 10 November, the ASLEF union announced that around 9,500 train divers at 12 train operators would strike on 26 November. On 20 December, ASLEF announced a 24-hour strike involving drivers at 15 train companies for 5 January 2023, falling in between two strikes announced by the RMT for January. On 17 January ASLEF announced a further two strikes, to be held on 1 and 3 February.

Transport Salaried Staffs' Association
On 30 June, the Transport Salaried Staffs' Association (TSSA) confirmed its members at Avanti West Coast had voted overwhelmingly for strikes and action short of a strike, ostensibly over the same issues that had triggered the RMT dispute, with 86% voting for strike action and 91% voting for action short of a strike on a 91% turnout. The union said it also planned to ballot staff at Network Rail and other train companies who operate at stations along the West Coast Main Line. On 11 July, TSSA members at Southwestern also voted to take industrial action.

The TSSA joined the RMT on the 18 and 20 August strikes.

On 31 August, another TSSA strike affecting TransPennine Express, West Midlands Trains, Avanti West Coast, c2c, CrossCountry, East Midlands Railway, Great Western Railway, LNER and Southeastern, as well as Network Rail, was announced for 26 September, when it would commence at midday.

Merseyrail
On 22 June it was reported that members of the Transport Salaried Staffs' Association (TSSA) had voted to accept a 7.1% pay rise following an ongoing dispute with Merseyrail which had led to strike action. Unlike the train operators involved in the national dispute, Merseyrail is a fully devolved Train Operating Company and therefore not required to consult the government on issues such as levels of pay and industrial disputes. Manuel Cortes, General Secretary of the TSSA, described the deal as "a sensible outcome to a reasonable offer".

London Underground
On 24 June, members of the RMT working on the London Underground voted to continue with strike action for a further six months in an ongoing dispute over pensions and job cuts. The continued industrial action was supported by 90% of voting members on a 53% turnout. On 3 August RMT workers on the London Underground network, and London Overground trains served by Arriva Rail London, announced a 24-hour strike for 19 August; workers at Arriva Rail London had rejected a 5% pay offer.

Air transport
On 23 June, it was announced that 700 staff at Heathrow Airport who belong to the GMB and Unite unions had voted to hold strike action during the summer holidays, when the number of overseas travellers was expected to be at pre-pandemic levels. On 7 July the strike action was suspended following further discussions between union representatives and British Airways, which had resulted in what the union described as a "vastly improved" pay offer.

On 7 December, it was announced that UK Border Force staff at several UK airports and who belong to the Public and Commercial Services Union (PCS) would hold eight days of strike action over Christmas.

On 3 March 2023, Loganair announced it would suspend flights between Inverness Airport and some island airports for at least six weeks from 17 March because of industrial action scheduled to begin at Highland and Islands Airports Limited.

Buses

On 1 July it was confirmed that roughly 370 Unite members employed as bus drivers at Stagecoach Merseyside & South Lancashire  would begin eight days of strike action from 4 July in a dispute over wages. Around 1,600 Unite members working for London United Busways staged a 48-hour strike on 19 and 20 August, affecting bus routes in West and South West London, as well as parts of Surrey, and over 2,000 Unite members working for Arriva London are set to stage continuous strike action from 4 October, affecting bus routes in North, East and South London.

On 13 February 2023, a long-running dispute between the Unite union and Abellio London, involving around 1,600 bus drivers in London was resolved when they accepted a deal that would mean drivers with two years' service being paid £18 an hour. On 2 March, members of the Unite union working for National Express West Midlands voted to strike, with strike action set to begin on 16 March. The industrial action would involve 3,000 bus drivers and affect 1,600 bus routes across the Birmingham, Coventry, Wolverhampton and other parts of the West Midlands. On 13 March, the strike scheduled for 16 March was called off after they received a revised pay offer, which Unite said it would put to its members. However, on 16 March, a fresh strike was called for Monday 20 March after Unite claimed National Express would not allow the drivers to vote on the pay offer.

Freight
On 5 August, the Unite union announced that 1,900 workers at Felixstowe Docks, one of the UK's largest ports, would stage an eight day strike from 21 August after rejecting a 7% pay rise from the Felixstowe Dock and Railway Company. Unite described the pay offer as "significantly below" the rate of inflation. The strike represented the first such industrial action for three decades.

Over 70 lorry drivers and shunters represented by Unite and employed at a depot of the dairy company Müller in Stonehouse, Gloucestershire took strike action between 25–27 August and 1–3 September after the company imposed changes to employees' rosters that would result in working at least one day every weekend, after the company had signed an agreement with Unite six months previously committing to no roster changes. The drivers undertook a further 11 day strike from 25 October, and Unite has said that more strikes will be scheduled if the roster changes are not rescinded.

Barristers

On 27 June, members of the Criminal Bar Association in England and Wales began four weeks of industrial action after rejecting a 15% pay raise. The government planned the raise to begin October 2022; the CBA said the proposal only amounted to 9 percent pay increase and was insufficient to retain barristers. The walkout disrupted 90% of proceedings at the Old Bailey as barristers demanded a 25% increase. This came after two decades of cuts to and freezes of legal aid rates in addition to a 28% decrease in real wages of barristers, whose average salary for the first three years was £12,200. 

On 22 August it was announced that barristers had voted to strike indefinitely from 5 September, with 79.9% of those voting on the issue in favour of the plans. On 10 October the Criminal Bar Association announced that barristers in England and Wales had voted to end their industrial action after accepting a pay deal worth 15% from the government, with 57% of those entitled to vote doing so.

Postal service

On 27 June, it was announced that members of the Communication Workers Union (CWU) at 114 Crown Post Offices, the largest branches typically on a high street or city centre, would walk out on 11 July in an ongoing dispute over pay. It would be the third time the union had staged industrial action during 2022 after members rejected a 3% pay rise and £500 lump sum.

On 29 June, Royal Mail managers belonging to the Unite union voted to take industrial action in a dispute over redundancies and a redeployment programme to bring in what they described as "worsening terms and conditions"; the vote for strike action was 86% in the UK mainland and 89% in Northern Ireland. On 19 July Royal Mail workers belonging to the Communication Workers Union voted to take strike action; the stoppage would involve roughly 115,000 staff members. The first of four one day Royal Mail strikes was held on 26 August, with further industrial action planned for 31 August, and 8 and 9 September. The 9 September strike was suspended following the death of Queen Elizabeth II the previous day.

On 28 September, the Communication Workers Union announced a further 19 days of strikes through October and November 2022, with industrial action targeted to affect peak periods of postal service usage, including Black Friday and Cyber Monday. On 30 October, the CWU announced they had called off strikes for the next two weeks following a legal letter sent to them by Royal Mail, but said the strike action would continue on 12 November. On 31 October, the CWU announced plans to meet the following day to discuss further strike action after rejecting a 7% pay deal over two years that was subject to postal workers agreeing to changes such as Sunday working and start times. The CWU accused Royal Mail of "imposing change not negotiating".

Healthcare

In summer 2022 the government announced below inflation pay rises which lead to a series of strike ballots by health unions.  

In November 2022 James Smith of the London School of Hygiene & Tropical Medicine, Ryan Essex of the University of Greenwich and Rita Issa of University College London wrote in The Lancetthere was no clear evidence of rising patient morbidity or mortality during periods of strike action. Minimum service level agreements for healthcare typically ensured the most urgent services continued.  One of many results of health underfunding was lower pay, which lead to staff leaving and further weakened the health system. It was argued short-term disruption was undertaken to achieve greater long-term collective benefit. It was further argued that health professionals have a duty to draw attention to, protest against, and resist actions that harm collective health.  The authors called for solidarity between different health care unions.

Doctors
On 28 June, GPs at the Annual General Meeting of the British Medical Association voted to take industrial action over new contracts requiring them to work on weekday evenings and Saturdays.

On 30 August, and following an emergency meeting of its members, the British Medical Association announced plans to ballot junior doctors on industrial action.

On 20 February 2023, junior doctor in England voted to strike in their ongoing dispute for a 26% pay rise, and announced they would stage a 72-hour walkout. The British Medical Association maintained junior doctors' pay was cut by 26% since 2008 after inflation was considered. On 24 February, the British Medical Association announced that junior doctors in England would begin a three-day strike on 13 March. On 4 March it was reported that senior consultants covering for junior doctors during the strike were demanding £158 pre hour, rising to £282 per hour at night, three times their usual pay.

Nurses
On 6 October 2022, the Royal College of Nursing announced plans to ballot its 300,000 members on strike action, the first time it had done so in its 106-year history. The RCN also said it would recommend its members voted in favour of industrial action. In solidarity with the RCN ballot, Unison announced that they would concurrently ballot their NHS workers for industrial action, with the ballot opening on 27 October.

On 9 November, the Royal College of Nursing announced that it had achieved a mandate to strike in the majority of NHS trusts.  On 17 November, the RCN warned the Secretary of State for Health and Social Care, Steve Barclay, that the Government had 5 days to open formal negotiations or strikes would be announced for December 2022. The RCN later confirmed that strikes would commence on 15 and 20 December. Following further failed negotiations, the union's members went on strike again on the 18 and 19 January 2023, in more hospitals than the December 2022 strikes. On 16 January 2023, the Royal College of Nursing announced a further two strike days for England and Wales on 6 and 7 February, which are set to be the biggest so far.

On 16 February, the Royal College of Nursing announced a 48-hour strike to begin on 1 March, which it said would be the biggest in England so far, with half of hospital, mental health and community services affected. However, on 21 February, it was announced the strike had been called off to allow the Royal College of Nursing and Department of Health and Social Care to enter into renewed negotiations.

Scotland
On 21 December, the Royal College of Nursing in Scotland rejected a 7.5% pay deal, and announced that strike dates would be confirmed in January 2023. On 23 December, Scottish Health Secretary Humza Yousaf confirmed he would resume talks with trade unions in a bid to avoid strike action taking place in the Scottish National Health Service. On 13 January 2023, the GMB and RCN unions announced strikes in Scotland would be put on hold while negotiations were held on a pay deal.

On 17 February 2023, the Royal College of Nursing recommended its members accept a new pay offer of 6.5%. The offer from the Scottish Government also included changes to conditions.

Ambulance workers
On 6 December, ambulance workers belonging to the GMB, Unison and Unite announced two one-day strikes on 21 and 28 December; the strikes would affect non-life threatening calls. On 18 January 2023 a further four strike days were announced, including 6 February, which would coincide with a walkout by nurses, creating the largest strike within the NHS so far.

On 3 March 2023, the GMB and Unison unions called off ambulance strikes in England scheduled for 6 and 8 March after the UK government agreed to reopen talks on pay for the 2022–23 and 2023–24 financial years. Unite said their strikes would still go ahead after they refused to join any talks, citing unreasonable conditions from the government for their decision. However, on 5 March Unite announced it had called off the strikes to enter into discussions with the government.

Wales
On 20 February 2023, three days of strikes involving almost half of ambulance workers in Wales began, with members of the GMB union walking out on 20 February, and members of the Unite union walking out on 21 and 22 February. On 21 February, ambulance workers belonging to the Unite union called two further strikes for 6 and 10 March. On 3 March, the Unite and GMB unions called off a planned strike by the Welsh Ambulance Service scheduled for Monday 6 March after "significant progress" in talks with the Welsh Government. On 8 March, members of the Welsh Ambulance Service belonging to the Unite union called off a strike scheduled for Friday 10 March following "progress" with officials from the Welsh Government.

NHS staff in England
On 16 March 2023, NHS staff in England, including nurses and ambulance staff, were offered a 5% pay rise from April, along with a one-off payment of £1,655 to cover backdated pay. The offer did not include doctors, who are on a different contract. Union leaders said they would recommend their members accept the offer.

Telecommunications

On 30 June CWU members working for BT Group voted to take industrial action over pay, with strike action expected to involve around 40,000 of the company's frontline workers, mostly engineering and call centre staff, and would be BT's first nationwide industrial action since 1987. Two days of strike action were subsequently announced for 29 July and 1 August, and went ahead as scheduled. Another two-day strike was held on 30 and 31 August.

On 28 November it was reported that BT bosses had reached an agreement with union bosses that would give workers earning less than £50,000 a year an annual pay increase worth 16%, or £1,500.

Education
In summer 2022 the government announced below inflation pay rises which lead to a series of strike ballots by education unions.

Schools
On 19 June The Observer reported that the National Education Union would ballot its 450,000 members on industrial action if teachers did not receive a pay rise close to the rate of inflation, while it was also reported that Unison had warned of industrial action among medical staff if they were not offered a pay rise.

In Scotland, non-teaching staff in 11 council areas were scheduled to stage a three-day strike in early September, but this was called off after the Unison, Unite and GMB unions agreed a pay deal.

On 14 October, the UK's two largest teaching unions, the National Education Union and National Association of Schoolmasters and Union of Women Teachers (NASUWT) announced plans to ballot their members on strike action after receiving the offer of a 3.5% pay rise from the Department for Education. Both unions have demanded a 12% pay rise to keep pace with the level of inflation. On 12 January 2023, the NASUWT announced that despite 9 out of 10 members who voted opting for industrial action, members working in state funded schools would not be striking due to a 42% turnout; 8% less than the 50% turnout ratio required by the government. On 16 January the National Education Union announced that its members had voted to strike, and confirmed that seven days of strike action would be held in February and March; three national strikes in England and Wales would be held on 1 and 15 February, and 15 March, as well as four days on which regional strike action would take place. 

On 10 November, the Educational Institute of Scotland (EIS), Scotland's largest Teaching Union voted overwhelmingly in favour of strike action after receiving a pay offer of 5%. 96% of members voted yes to strike action on a turnout of 71%. The first strike action was scheduled for 24 November. On 22 November, a revised 6.85% pay offer was rejected by the EIS, meaning the industrial action would go ahead. In January 2023 the EIS announced a further 22 days of strike action. This commenced with 16 days of "rolling" strike action, whereby each day would see teachers in two local authorities striking; Glasgow and East Lothian were the first two areas to be affected.

Members of the Scottish Secondary Teachers' Association (SSTA) were scheduled to stage a strike in February 2023, but after they voted to accept a new pay offer from the Scottish Government, it was announce on 25 February that they had suspended the strike action scheduled for the following week. On 3 March, the Educational Institute of Scotland and other teaching unions called off a planned 20 days of rolling strikes scheduled to begin on 13 March after receiving an improved pay offer from the Scottish Government, worth 14.6% over 28 months. The proposals were then put to a ballot. On 4 March, the NASUWT said it would ballot its members on the offer. On 10 March, members of the Educational Institute of Scotland voted to accept the pay deal, thus bringing their strike action to an end. On 14 March, members of the NASUWT narrowly voted to accept the pay offer, ending the prospect of further strike action in schools in Scotland. 

On 10 March, members of the National Education Union in Wales called off two strikes planned for 15 and 16 March after receiving a new pay offer from the Welsh Government.

Universities

On 24 October, the UK's largest higher education union, the UCU voted in favour of strike action in a national ballot. On 8 November the UCU announced three days of strike action on 24, 25 and 30 November. On 12 January 2023, a further 18 days of strike action were announced through February and March, and were expected to affect 150 universities in the UK. On 17 February the University and College Union announced that seven days of strikes planned for February and March had been called off after "significant progress" was made in discussions with their employers.

Refuse workers

On 18 August, and following a pay dispute with the Convention of Scottish Local Authorities (COSLA), refuse workers belonging to the Unison, Unite and GMB trade unions launched industrial action in Edinburgh. The 12-day strike began as the city played host to the 2022 Edinburgh Festival and led Public Health Scotland to issue a public health warning because of uncollected rubbish in urban areas. The walkout ended at 04:59 on 30 August. On 29 August, the three trade unions involved in the dispute announced plans for a second strike.

On 1 September, First Minister of Scotland Nicola Sturgeon met with council leaders and trade union leaders to resolve the dispute. On 2 September, the strikes were called off by the three unions involved after a 10% pay deal was agreed upon.

Firefighters
On 30 January 2023, it was confirmed that members of the Fire Brigades Union (FBU) had voted to take strike action over pay following a ballot earlier in the month in which 80% of those who had voted had favoured strike action The FBU said it would not announce any strike dates until it had spoken with its members. On 9 February it was announced that industrial action by firefighters had been called off after the pay offer was revised.

Others

PCS strikes
On 29 November, members of the Public and Commercial Services Union (PCS) announced a series of rolling strikes from 13 December to 16 January 2023. The strikes will involve driving examiners and rural payment officers at 250 sites. As of January 2023, the PCS had announced over 120 government departments which had voted for strike action. On 11 January the PCS announced that around 100,000 civil servants at 124 government departments would hold a one-day strike on 1 February.

Financial Conduct Authority
On 4 May, members of Unite embarked on historic strike action at the Financial Conduct Authority (FCA) in London and Edinburgh the first such action since the inception of the regulator. It followed a vote in April 2022 when 75% of FCA staff with Unite memberships voted in favour of the action against the regulator over disputes around changes to pay and conditions as well as the FCA’s refusal to recognise Unite. The FCA rejected all approaches to engage in discussions with employee representatives and attempts by the union to reach a settlement.  

A second wave of strike action took place on 9 June and 10 June with significant political support from the Labour Party front bench including Rachel Reeves the Shadow Chancellor of the Exchequer, Angela Rayner the Shadow Chancellor of the Duchy of Lancaster and Tulip Siddiq the Shadow Treasury Minister.  

A third wave of two-day strike action planned for July 2022 was paused after Unite announced it was exploring options with the regulator to secure a route to union recognition. However, this was not to materialise and on 7 December Unite called on the FCA to have a staff-led action plan which includes recognising the union, changes to performance, and health benefit contributions scaled to pay.

On 8 March 2023, the new FCA Chair, Ashley Alder, and FCA CEO Nikhil Rathi, appeared before a Treasury Committee hearing where Emma Hardy MP told the FCA to stop blocking information about trade unions internally including FCA employees' ability to share links to the Unite union’s website.

Broadcasting
On 19 January 2023, and following the announcement of cuts to BBC Local Radio, it was announced that members of the National Union of Journalists would hold a consultative ballot on whether to take strike action over the proposed changes. On 31 January, the NUJ reported that a consultative ballot had favoured strike action, with industrial action potentially beginning on the week of 13 March. On 28 February, members of the National Union of Journalists working for the BBC regional service in England voted to take strike action over planned cuts to BBC Local Radio. A 24-hour strike was scheduled for 15 March to coincide with Budget Day. The strike went ahead as scheduled, beginning at 11am, and requiring a syndicated programme to air in some areas rather than the usual local programming. 

On 9 March 2023, the National Union of Journalists announced plans to hold a strike ballot among staff at Northern Ireland's BBC Radio Foyle following a management decision to implement schedule changes, which included replacing the two hour morning programme with a 30 minute version. Union officials had been negotiating with management over the proposed changes, but the talks had ended a few days earlier, on 6 March, when it was decided the changes would go ahead.

Distribution
On 25 January 2023, the first ever strike by UK employees of Amazon took place, with 300 staff at a warehouse in Coventry staging a one-day walk out, in a dispute over pay and conditions. On 13 February the GMB union announced a further series of strikes at the distribution centre during February and March. The GMB wants workers to be paid £15 per hour rather than the current £10.50. Amazon does not recognise the union so has refused to enter into negotiations with its representatives.

Rugby union
In January 2023, discussions between the Welsh Rugby Players Association and the Professional Rugby Board commenced after a long-running dispute over pay and the terms on which players in Wales could represent the Wales national rugby union team. On 16 February, it was reported the national team were considering strike action on 25 February, the date of a scheduled Six Nations Championship match against England. Alun Wyn Jones a member of the team, said that striking would be a "last resort" but that it was "hard to deny" it as a possibility. Warren Gatland, Wales's head coach, said that he would not support his players going on strike. Gatland was scheduled to name the line up of the Wales team for the game at midday on 21 February, but the announcement was delayed as the threat of strike action continued. On 22 February, an agreement was reached between players and the Welsh Rugby Union (WRU), confirming that the fixture would go ahead, and the Welsh team was announced the following day.

Commentary

Bank of England 
On 9 February 2023, Andrew Bailey, the governor of the Bank of England said that as it was the view of the bank that inflation would "fall very rapidly" during the year, and that this should be taken into account by public sector workers when asking for pay rises. The bank's prediction is that it will drop from 10.5% to 4% by the end of the year.  Bailey maintained he thought  headline inflation was improving, it had fallen.  Bailey added "but we need to see more evidence that this will take effect.”

IFS 
Also in February 2023, the Institute for Fiscal Studies (IFS) said that it anticipated the government would borrow roughly £30bn less in 2023 than it had predicted in November 2022. £6bn would probably be spent on a fuel duty freeze, but borrowing would still be almost £25bn lower than previously anticipated. The IFS added that the gap between public and private sector pay had widened a great deal during the recent rise in inflation and "it is difficult… to see an end to public sector pay disputes that does not involve the Treasury providing some extra cash to departments" The IFS also said a 5.5% increase in pay throughout the public sector would match the Consumer Price Index and would cost around £5bn, this was small compared to the recent underspend. The IFS added "Most obviously, the impact of injecting £5bn into an economy with an annual GDP well in excess of £2,000bn would surely be modest." Paul Johnson of the IFS said fears raising public sector pay would fuel inflation were exaggerated. The IFS said increasing the current 3.5% average pay offer to 5.5% could cost less than £5bn rather than the £28bn Hunt suggested.

Journalists 
Martin Wolf of the Financial Times maintained in December 2022 since 2010 real average pay rose 5.5% in the private sector till September 2022, but fell 5.9% in the public sector. This adversely affected recruitment and retention of staff as well as causing strikes.  Wolf said the government should keep public sector pay comparable with private sector pay particularly where there are noteworthy recruitment and retention issues.

In November 2022 James Smith of the London School of Hygiene & Tropical Medicine, Ryan Essex of the University of Greenwich and Rita Issa of University College London wrote in The Lancet  that pay had not risen in a way that compensated for a worsening cost of living crisis and this clearly motivated strike action. Public sector worker stated their demands while there was under-investment in essential public services and their workforce. Private sector workers made pay demands while there was high corporate profit.

TUC 
The TUC said in October 2022 that almost 2 million public sector workers "could be close" to leaving due to "poor pay", this could cause crisis in the UK public services.  Also in October 2022 the TUC stated millions of key workers helped the UK manage the worst of the Covid pandemic, but had the prospect of another year of "pay misery" due to the government, as the cost of living rose.  Frances O'Grady former TUC general secretary, stated many were "at breaking point" due to low pay, unmanagable workloads and "lack of recognition,"  The TUC referred to YouGov research, which  found one third of the public sector workers surveyed were either considering leaving or had already taken steps to do so. The TUC feared this could amount to 1.8 million people nationwide.  O’Grady stated following years of severe pay cuts, nurses, teachers, refuse workers and millions of other public servants experienced their living standards severely reduced.  The TUC stated the 2022 low pay awards came after a decade of pay cuts for key public sector workers. Living costs were increasingly burdensome, which the October 2022 United Kingdom government crisis by Liz Truss worsened.  The TUC maintained real pay was falling in the public sector and large parts of the private sector.  O’Grady stated the government would be at fault if there were large scale public sector strike action during the months following October 2022.  O’Grady stated the goverment were holding public sector pay down but allowing bankers unlimited bonuses.

Following a January 2023 tax receipt that was higher than forecast by the Office for Budget Responsibility (OBR), the government had a £5.4bn revenue surplus for the month. In February 2022 the TUC urged Jeremy Hunt to use the revenue to offer higher pay rises to public sector workers to end strike deadlock. Paul Nowak of the TUC said this showed the government could break the deadlock on strikes. Nowak said that without what he considered "a fair pay settlement" staffing shortages harming schools, hospitals and other frontline services would worsen. Hunt said public finances were under pressure, and that he would prioritise reducing debt and reducing debt interest payments.  Ruth Gregory of Capital Economics stated Hunt had the opportunity to introduce "tax cuts and/or spending rises".

References

2022 labor disputes and strikes
2023 labor disputes and strikes
2022 in the United Kingdom
2023 in the United Kingdom
Industrial disputes and strikes
Industrial disputes and strikes
Industrial disputes and strikes
Rail transport strikes
Industrial disputes and strikes
Boris Johnson
Liz Truss
Rishi Sunak